The 2010 Internazionali di Tennis di Bergamo Trofeo Trismoka was a professional tennis tournament played on indoor hard courts. It was part of the 2010 ATP Challenger Tour. It took place in Bergamo, Italy between 8 and 14 February 2010.

ATP entrants

Seeds

 Rankings are as of February 1, 2010.

Other entrants
The following players received wildcards into the singles main draw:
  Marco Crugnola
  Laurynas Grigelis
  Gilles Müller
  Andrea Stoppini

The following players received entry from the qualifying draw:
  Sergei Bubka
  Ervin Eleskovic
  Evgeny Kirillov
  Roman Valent

The following player received special exempt into the main draw:
 Tobias Kamke

Champions

Singles

 Karol Beck def.  Gilles Müller,  6–4, 6–4

Doubles

 Jonathan Marray /  Jamie Murray def.  Karol Beck /  Jiří Krkoška, 1–6, 7–6(2), [10–8]

External links

Internazionali di Tennis di Bergamo Trofeo Trismoka
2010
February 2010 sports events in Italy